Charles W. Harlow (May 25, 1942 - March 28, 2020) was an American politician from Maine. He served on the Portland, Maine City Council from 1990 to 1999, including a term as ceremonial mayor from 1992 to 1993. In 2004, Harlow was elected as a Democrat to the Maine House of Representatives from District 116. He served until 2010, when he was replaced by his daughter, Denise Harlow.

Personal
Harlow was born on May 25, 1942, in Rumford, Maine. He graduated from the University of Maine in 1965 with a B.S. He earned a Master's of Education from Maine three years later. A career educator, Harlow taught at Wells High School, Mexico High School, Mount Blue High School and, from 1972 until his retirement in 2004, at Cheverus High School in Portland. Harlow suffered from dementia and was reported missing in October 2013. A search of the Riverside Industrial Park resulted in his being found inside a bakery.

References

1942 births
2020 deaths
Democratic Party members of the Maine House of Representatives
University of Maine alumni
People from Rumford, Maine
Portland, Maine City Council members
Mayors of Portland, Maine
Schoolteachers from Maine
Educators from Portland, Maine